The following is a list of Greater Western Sydney Giants leading goalkickers in each of their seasons in the Australian Football League (AFL) and AFL Women's.

AFL leading goalkickers

AFL Women's leading goalkickers

References
General

 

Specific

Goalkickers
Sydney-sport-related lists
Australian rules football-related lists